= Paul Elizondo =

American politician

Member of the Texas House of Representatives from the 57-I district
- In office January 9, 1979 – January 11, 1983
- Preceded by: R.L. 'Bob' Vale
- Succeeded by: District abolished

Personal details
- Born: June 12, 1935 San Antonio, Texas
- Died: December 27, 2018 (aged 83) San Antonio, Texas
- Party: Democratic

Paul Elizondo (June 12, 1935 – December 27, 2018) was an American politician who served in the Texas House of Representatives from the 57-I district from 1979 to 1983.

He died on December 27, 2018, in San Antonio, Texas at age 83.
